The 1848 United States presidential election in Missouri took place on November 7, as part of the 1848 United States presidential election. Voters chose seven representatives, or electors to the Electoral College, who voted for President and Vice President.

Missouri voted for the Democratic candidate, Lewis Cass, over Whig candidate Zachary Taylor. Cass won Missouri by a margin of 10.18%.

Results

See also
 United States presidential elections in Missouri

References

Missouri
1848
1848 Missouri elections